Luinha is a town in northern Angola

Transport
It is served by a station on the Luanda Railway. There is a junction to a branchline to the south.

See also
 Railway stations in Angola

References 

Populated places in Angola